Hugh Faulkner is a Canadian politician.

Hugh Faulkner is also the name of:

Hugh Faulkner (doctor), British doctor
Hugh Faulkner, founding director of Help the Aged.

See also
Hugh Falconer, Scottish botanist and geologist
Faulkner (surname)